Joel Felix may refer to:
 Joel Felix (historian)
 Joel Felix (footballer)